Torralba is a municipality in the province of Cuenca, Castile-La Mancha, Spain. It had a population of 191 in 2004.

Main sights
Ruins of the castle (or Torre Alba) from which  the village takes its name.
Hermitage of Nuestra Señora de las Nieves (15th-16th century)
Parish church of Santo Domingo de Silos

References

Municipalities in the Province of Cuenca